Rieder Bach may refer to:

Rieder Bach (Rinchnach), a river of Bavaria, Germany, tributary of the Rinchnach
Rieder Bach (Mindel), a river of Bavaria, Germany, tributary of the Mindel
Rieder Bach (Antiesen), a river in the town Ried im Innkreis of the Austrian state of Upper Austria, tributary of the Antiesen